The Slovenian Women's Volleyball League or 1A. DOL ženske is a women's volleyball competition organized by the Volleyball Federation of Slovenia. It was established in 1991.

List of champions

Titles by club

References

External links
Volleyball Federation of Slovenia 
  1. DOL ženske. women.volleybox.net

Slovenia
Volleyball in Slovenia
Slovenian 1. DOL ženske
Sports leagues established in 1991
1991 establishments in Slovenia
Professional sports leagues in Slovenia